Screamer Magazine,  which billed itself "The Loudest Mag on The Planet", was an American rock music magazine. It was created by David F. Castagno in October 1987.

The publication started out as a vehicle in which to promote local rock bands in the Los Angeles area. By early 1988 Screamer conducted interviews with Guns N' Roses, Metallica, Ozzy Osbourne and others.

In 1992 Castagno sold a controlling interest in the magazine to McMullen & Yee Publishing, which was eventually acquired by Primedia. In 1994 Castagno parted ways with his new publishing company, but was given the magazine to continue publishing on his own. However, the musical landscape had changed so much he decided to close it in May 1994.

In the spring of 2011 Castagno decided to digitize his archive of vintage magazines and re-launch an online version of Screamer Magazine.

References

Music magazines published in the United States
Defunct magazines published in the United States
Magazines established in 1987
Magazines disestablished in 1994
Magazines published in Los Angeles